Deep in the Heart of Texas is a 1942 American black-and-white Western film directed by Elmer Clifton and starring Johnny Mack Brown as a man instrumental in restoring Texas after the end of the American Civil War. The film is best known for its performance of American folk song "Deep in the Heart of Texas" which is sung by country singer Tex Ritter with the Jimmy Wakely Trio.

Plot 
The film's main character is righteous Jim Mallory. He and his friend, "Happy" T. Snodgrass, are seeking Jim's father, because they have heard about his cruel domination. They try to stop him with this gang. After they manage to stop their activity with the help of newspaper publisher Jonathan Taylor, his daughter Nan and Governor representative Brent Gordon. But then, Jim is put into the jail. After this complication, Jim's father decides he joins Brent and Jonathan and they together let Jim free.

Cast 

 Johnny Mack Brown as Jim Mallory
 Tex Ritter as Brent Gordon
 Fuzzy Knight as 'Happy' T. Snodgrass
 Jennifer Holt as Nan Taylor
 William Farnum as Colonel Mallory
 Harry Woods as Sergeant Idaho
 Kenneth Harlan as Captain Sneed
 Pat O'Malley as Jonathan Taylor
 Roy Brent as Sam Franklin
 Edmund Cobb as Lieutenant Matthews
 Jimmy Wakely Trio as Saloon Musicians

Accolades
In 2004, the American Film Institute nominated song "Deep in the Heart of Texas" from this film for AFI's 100 Years...100 Songs.

References

External links
 
 
 
 

1942 films
1942 Western (genre) films
American Western (genre) films
American black-and-white films
1940s English-language films
Films directed by Elmer Clifton
Films scored by Hans J. Salter
Films set in Texas
Universal Pictures films
1940s American films